Waconia is a city in Carver County, Minnesota, United States. Waconia attracts visitors to nearby Lake Waconia, a lake locally renowned for its fishing and recreation opportunities.

The city's population was 13,033 at the 2020 census.

Geography

Minnesota State Highways 5 and 284; and Carver County Highway 10 are the main routes in Waconia.

Demographics

2000 census
As of the census of 2000, there were 6,814 people, 2,568 households, and 1,848 families living in the city. The racial makeup of the city was 97.06% White, 0.34% African American, 0.12% Native American, 0.65% Asian, 0.01% Pacific Islander, 1.00% from other races, and 0.82% from two or more races. Hispanic or Latino of any race were 1.28% of the population.

There were 2,568 households, out of which 40.7% had children under the age of 18 living with them, 61.0% were married couples living together, 7.8% had a female householder with no husband present, and 28.0% were non-families. 23.3% of all households were occupied by one person and 12.2% had someone living alone who was 65 years of age or older.  The average household size was 2.62 and the average family size was 3.12.

The city population had a wide age variety; with 29.9% being under the age of 18, 5.8% from 18 to 24, 35.5% from 25 to 44, 16.3% from 45 to 64, and 12.4% who were 65 years of age or older.  The median age was 33 years. For every 100 females, there were 91.1 males.  For every 100 females age 18 and over, there were 89.5 males.

The median income for a household in the city was $55,705, and the median income for a family was $67,703. Males had a median income of $43,535 versus $29,488 for females. The per capita income for the city was $26,996.  About 2.9% of families and 3.8% of the population were below the poverty line, including 3.7% of those under age 18 and 9.5% of those age 65 or over.

2010 census
As of the census of 2010, there were 10,697 people, 3,909 households, and 2,748 families living in the city. The racial makeup of the city was 95.7% White, 1.1% African American, 0.3% Native American, 1.1% Asian, 0.7% from other races, and 1.1% from two or more races. Hispanic or Latino of any race were 2.5% of the population.

There were 3,909 households, of which 45.2% had children under the age of 18 living with them, 60.1% were married couples living together, 7.1% had a female householder with no husband present, 3.0% had a male householder with no wife present, and 29.7% were non-families. 25.6% of all households were made up of individuals, and 12% had someone living alone who was 65 years of age or older. The average household size was 2.70 and the average family size was 3.31.

The median age in the city was 34.9 years. 32.5% of residents were under the age of 18; 5% were between the ages of 18 and 24; 30.7% were from 25 to 44; 20.7% were from 45 to 64; and 11.3% were 65 years of age or older. The gender makeup of the city was 48.4% male and 51.6% female.

Economy

Top employers
According to the city's 2019 Comprehensive Annual Financial Report (CAFR), the top employers in the city are:

Politics

Education
Waconia Public Schools operates five schools. There are also two private schools within Waconia to make seven total:
 Southview Elementary, grades K–5
 Bayview Elementary, grades K–5
 Laketown Elementary, grades K-5
 Waconia Middle School, grades 6–8
 St. Joseph Catholic Education Center, grades PreK–8
 Trinity Lutheran School, grades K–8
 Waconia High School, grades 9–12

History
A post office has been in operation at Waconia since 1860. The city took its name from Lake Waconia.

National Register of Historic Places gallery
Waconia has several buildings listed on the National Register of Historic Places (see: National Register of Historic Places listings in Carver County, Minnesota). One of the more prominent listings is for Coney Island of the West on Lake Waconia, where cottages, boathouses and resort hotels attracted tourists, especially from 1884 until the late 1920s, when the rise of the automobile allowed people to travel farther away for summer vacations.

Popular culture
 In the film Drop Dead Gorgeous, 1st Street near St. Joseph's Catholic Church in Waconia is used when the swan float explodes in the parade.

Notable people
 Robert O. Ashbach, Minnesota state legislator and businessman
 Jenn Bostic, singer and songwriter
 Bill Diessner, Minnesota state legislator and physician
 Aaron Elling, football player
 Don Herbert, Mr. Wizard and host of Mr. Wizard's World
 Noah McCourt, politician, disability advocate and speaker
 Susie Schmitt Hanson, (1860–1956) milliner, dressmaker and entrepreneur
 Bob Stinson, musician, lead guitarist for The Replacements
 Henry Wagener, Minnesota state legislator and farmer
 Maxx Williams, NFL tight end for the Arizona Cardinals, was born in Waconia
 Shane Wiskus, artistic gymnast, represented Team USA at the 2020 Summer Olympics

References

External links

Cities in Carver County, Minnesota
Cities in Minnesota
Dakota toponyms